is a Shinto shrine located in Higashi-ku, Fukuoka, Japan. It is dedicated to Emperor Chūai and Empress Jingū.

History

See also

List of Shinto shrines

Shinto shrines in Fukuoka Prefecture
Buildings and structures in Fukuoka
Tourist attractions in Fukuoka
Kanpei-taisha
Beppyo shrines